Alfred "Alf" Dieudonné Genon (30 September 1903 – 25 October 1974) was a Belgian boxer who competed in the 1924 Summer Olympics. He was born in Herstal. In 1924 he was eliminated in the quarterfinals of the lightweight class after losing to the upcoming bronze medalist Frederick Boylstein.

References

External links
 

1903 births
1974 deaths
Lightweight boxers
Olympic boxers of Belgium
Boxers at the 1924 Summer Olympics
People from Herstal
Belgian male boxers
Sportspeople from Liège Province